Dissothrix is a genus of flowering plants in the family Asteraceae.

There is only one known species, Dissothrix imbricata,  endemic to the state of Ceará in Brazil.

References

Endemic flora of Brazil
Monotypic Asteraceae genera
Eupatorieae